Younginiformes is a replacement name for the taxon Eosuchia, proposed by Alfred Romer in 1947.

The Eosuchia having become a wastebasket taxon for many probably distantly-related primitive diapsid reptiles ranging from the late Carboniferous to the Eocene, Romer proposed that this be replaced by Younginiformes, to include the Younginidae and a very few similar families, ranging from the Permian to the Triassic.

Younginiformes (including Acerosodontosaurus, Hovasaurus, Kenyasaurus, Tangasaurus, Thadeosaurus, Youngina,  et alia sensu Currie and other researchers in the 1980s) is probably not a clade. It appears to represent a grade of South African Permo-Triassic diapsids that are not more closely related to each other as a whole than they are to other reptiles. A cladistic analysis by Laurin and Pineiro (2017) recovers Parareptilia as not only part of Diapsida, but also sister to Younginiformes.

References

Sources

Paraphyletic groups
Permian reptiles
Triassic diapsids
Permian first appearances
Triassic extinctions